Krauser is a surname. Notable people with the surname include: 

 Carl Krauser (born 1981), U.S. Virgin Islands basketball player
 Peter B. Krauser (born 1947), Maryland judge
 Max Krauser (born 1908), Polish wrestler, European heavyweight champion 1933-35

Characters
 Jack Krauser, a freelance mercenary in the Resident Evil video games
 Johannes Krauser II, a band leader in the Detroit Metal City manga series
 Wolfgang Krauser von Stroheim, an opponent in the Fatal Fury video games

See also
 Krauser Domani, a three-wheeled vehicle developed by Michael Krauser
 Helmut Krausser (born 1964), German author, poet and playwright
 Kraus, a German surname
 Krause, a German surname
 Krauss, a German surname

German-language surnames